The communauté de communes de Marquion  is a former intercommunality in the Pas-de-Calais département of the Nord-Pas-de-Calais region of northern France. It was created in January 2001. It was merged into the Communauté de communes Osartis Marquion in January 2014.

Participants 
The communauté de communes comprised the following 17 communes:

Baralle  
Bourlon
Buissy 
Écourt-Saint-Quentin
Épinoy  
Graincourt-lès-Havrincourt 
Inchy-en-Artois
Lagnicourt-Marcel 
Marquion 
Oisy-le-Verger 
Palluel  
Pronville 
Quéant  
Rumaucourt
Sains-lès-Marquion 
Sauchy-Cauchy 
Sauchy-Lestrée

See also
Communes of the Pas-de-Calais department

References 

Marquion